Ryan Ricardo Straughan is a Barbadian politician and economist. He is a member of parliament in the House of Assembly of Barbados. He was first elected member of parliament in January 2018. He is the Minister of Finance and Economic Affairs.

References 

Living people
Barbadian politicians
Government ministers of Barbados
Barbados Labour Party politicians
Year of birth missing (living people)